Naserabad (also Romanized as Nāşerābād) is a village in Jaghin-e Jonubi Rural District, Jaghin District, Rudan County, Hormozgan Province, Iran. At the 2006 census, its population was 1,050, in 234 families.

References 

Populated places in Rudan County